Anatinomma is a genus of beetles in the family Cerambycidae, containing the following species:

 Anatinomma alveolatum Bates, 1892
 Anatinomma bispinosum Aurivillius, 1916
 Anatinomma brevicornis Fisher, 1944
 Anatinomma insularis Chemsak & Linsley, 1964

References

Hesperophanini